Muskowekwan 85-2A is an Indian reserve of the Muskowekwan First Nation in Saskatchewan. It is located 10 kilometres northwest of Leross. In the 2016 Canadian Census, it recorded a population of 0.

References

Indian reserves in Saskatchewan
Division No. 10, Saskatchewan